The Women's 44 kg event at the 2010 South American Games was held on March 20.

Medalists

Results

Main Bracket

Repechage

References

 Report

W44
South American Games W44